Genomförandegruppen (The Implementation group) was the name of an internal work group that in 2008, within the Reinfeldt Cabinet office, in Sweden was formed, which, according to a press release later issued by the Cabinet office, had been tasked to "produce decision basis for continued effectivisation of the [Swedish] defence force's materiel procurement".
The Group also were claimed to have been tasked to propose how a "purposive materiel supply adapted to needs of the new intervention defence" could be achieved.
The purpose was stated to lower costs, but was also ideologically in line with the cabinet's stance of the infallible market forces, going from domestic development to "buy off the shelf" regardless of sarcastic remarks that there was no "Panzermarkt" to purchase from.
Genomförandegruppen was led by the secretary of state from the Defence department Håkan Jevrell, the other participants were state secretary Hans Lindblad (Finance department), state secretary Jöran Hägglund (Enterprise department), the members of parliament Holger Gustafsson (KD), Anders Svärd (C) och Allan Widman (Fp). To their assistance, they had a secretariat of public servants from the Defence department at disposal.
The group, carefully avoiding to consult military experts within the armed forces, wrote a report made public in 2008 were they presented an extensive list of procurements, projects and studies that were to either be reduced or eliminated entirely.
The two leading military bloggers at the time, WisemanWisdoms and Skipper were scolding in the critique of the results, calling the report the result of "amateur's night", not least because the abrupt terminations often resulted in higher costs than to complete the projects. The conclusion drawn by the Riksrevision when they were done with their inquiry of the matter was the same, the cuts had been made without consideration of the severe  impact of the defence capabilities while not even near to save as much money as Genomförandegruppen had predicted due to the (for  themselves) unexpected extra cost it resulted in.

Among the cancelled:
 Air defence missiles for the Visby-class corvette.
 REMO (renovation/modification) for CV90 and strv 122.
 Purchase of the newly developed AMOS-turret to mount in the 40 CV90 chassis already built for the specific purpose.
 Materiel for CAS to Swedish forces in international service.
 Purchase of tactical UAV for forces on international missions.
 Halflife REMO for HSwMS Orion (A201). This later resulted in the vessel having to be replaced as no longer seaworthy.

References

2006 establishments in Sweden
Politics of Sweden